Sidney John Watson (May 4, 1932 – April 25, 2004) was an American football player and college ice hockey coach.  He played halfback in the National Football League (NFL) for the Pittsburgh Steelers and Washington Redskins.  He played college football at Northeastern University.  He was also the head hockey coach at Bowdoin College from 1959 to 1983.

Early life
Watson was born in Andover, Massachusetts and attended Punchard High School.

College career
Watson attended and played football as a running back at Northeastern University, where he averaged more than 100 rushing yards per game and 7.1 yards per carry during his career.  He played on Northeastern's 1951 undefeated team, and was chosen Little All America in 1953 and captained the 1954 team.  He still holds Northeastern's school records for most single-season points (74) and held the record for most career points (191) until 1997.  In addition to lettering in football for three years, Watson also received one letter in basketball and three in ice hockey.

Professional football career
After graduating from college, Watson played in the National Football League for the Pittsburgh Steelers from 1955 to 1957.  He then played with the Washington Redskins in 1958.

Hockey coaching career
Watson became co-head coach of the Bowdoin College ice hockey team with C. Nels Corey in 1958.  He then became the full head coach in 1959, a position he held until 1983.  While coach, he led the Polar Bears to the ECAC 2 playoffs 16 times and won conference championships in 1971, 1975, 1976 and 1978.  Watson was awarded the Eddie Jeremiah Memorial Trophy, recognizing the national Small College Coach of the year in 1970, 1971 and 1978.  In 2001, he was awarded the prestigious Hobey Baker Legends of College Hockey Award.

Head coaching record

Administrator career
After retiring as a coach, Watson served as Bowdoin's Athletic Director. He was also the chairman of the NCAA ice Hockey Rules and Tournament Committee for six years, and served as president, vice president, secretary, treasurer and a member of the board of governors of the American College Hockey Coaches Association.

Legacy
In 1996, Bowdoin dedicated the Sidney J. Watson Fitness Facility in his honor. In 2004, following Watson's death, the Division III Men's Player of the Year Award was renamed the Sid Watson Award. In 2009, Bowdoin named their new ice hockey arena the Sidney J. Watson Arena, which holds approximately 2,300 spectators and is Leadership in Energy and Environmental Design (LEED) certified.

Personal life
Watson was married and had five children and 11 grandchildren.  He died after suffering a Myocardial infarction in Naples, Florida on April 25, 2004.

References

External links
 
 

1932 births
2004 deaths
People from Andover, Massachusetts
American football halfbacks
Northeastern Huskies football players
Pittsburgh Steelers players
Washington Redskins players
American ice hockey coaches
American men's ice hockey players
Ice hockey coaches from Massachusetts
Bowdoin Polar Bears men's ice hockey coaches
Northeastern Huskies men's ice hockey players
Northeastern Huskies men's basketball players
Players of American football from Massachusetts
American men's basketball players
Basketball players from Massachusetts
Sportspeople from Essex County, Massachusetts
Ice hockey players from Massachusetts